Goshko is a surname. Notable people with the surname include:

 John M. Goshko (1933–2014), American journalist
 Susannah Goshko, British civil servant